Eyles Irwin (1751–1817) was an Irish poet and writer. He rose in the East India Company's service from a civil servant to superintendent of the company's affairs in China, but failed to gain a place on the board of directors.

He is notable for publishing several volumes of poems, primarily on historical subjects; elegies, odes, and epistles; and miscellaneous writings. Although not born in Ireland, he became a member of the Royal Irish Academy due to his Irish parents' roots.

Biography

He was born at Calcutta (presently Kolkata) to Irish parents in 1751. His father was a native of Ireland who died in the service of East India Company. Irwin was educated at a private academy at Chiswick in England, and joined the East India Company in a civil capacity, serving at Madras (presently Chennai) in 1767. Due to his association with George Pigot, who was imprisoned and suspended, he too was suspended in 1775; consequently, he went back to England to lay his case before the board. His application was successful.

In 1778, he married Miss Brooke, who was related to Henry Brooke, the renowned Irish novelist and dramatist. In 1780, he was restored to his previous job and position by the Company at Madras. He returned to England in 1785 from Calcutta. In 1792, he was appointed, in conjunction with others, as superintendent of the Company's affairs in China, in which post he served for the next two years. In 1795, he made one or two attempts to gain a place on the board of directors, but failed. Until he died on 12 August 1817, he busied himself with social and literary pursuits.

Genealogy
Irwin's daughter Frances Sally Irwin married Cmdr. Edwin Toby Caulfeild son of Capt. Wade Toby Caulfeild and Lady Anne Cope of the Manor Catcombe, Wiltshire. Excerpt from a family tree scroll created circa mid 1800s.

"Pedigree of the Royal Descent of the Descendants of  Wade T Caulfeild Esquire and Anne Cope his wife:
The original name of Irvin, was Ereveine,  Sieurs d' Avianches ( handwriting not clear), Normandy. The Descendants of old Viking Family. The Erevines emmigrated to Scotland temp Wm The Conqueror.

The eldest son of Gov. Eyles Irwin,  Maj James I. of the 5th Dragoon Gds, volunteered to serve in the American War 1812, led the Forlorn (??) "Hope" at Storming the Fort??  first on the scaling ladder & shot down.

The head of the family has been seated at Drum Castle, Highlands. N.B. for some 500 years to the present man spells his name "Irvine".

An ancestor was a staunch Cavalier & Charles 1st proposed to raise him to the Peerage; but he declined, saying that no-one should accuse him of serving his master for any reward.  About 200 years ago two brothers of the family settled in the Co. Rosscommon & Fermanagh."

His works
 "Irwin's Voyages" in Two Volumes. Excerpt from 3rd Edition, Printed for J. Dodsley, Pall Mall, London. M.DCC.LXXXVIII.[1787] , [originally 1st Ed 1780]:
 "A Series of Adventures, in the course of: 
 -- A Voyage up the Red Sea on the coast of Arabia and Egypt, and of—A Route through the deserts of Thebais, in the year 1777: with a supplement of A Voyage from Venice to Latichea [?Latakia?]; and of a
 -- Route through the desarts of Arabia, By Aleppo, Bagdad, and the Tygris, to Busrah in the years 1780 and 1781.
In Letters to a Lady. by Eyles Irwin, Esq. In the service of the Hon(ble) East India Company, Illustrated with Maps and Cuts

Poetry
 St. Thomas's Mount, in 1771.
 Bedukah, an Indian pastoral, in 1776.
 Eastern Eclogues, in 1780

Elegies
 Nilyus, an Elegy on the victory of Admiral Nelson, in 1798.
 The Fall of Saragossa, in 1808.

Odes
 Ode on the death of Ayder Ally, in 1784.
 Triumph of innocence, an Ode on the deliverance of Maria Theresa Charlotte, in 1796.
 Ode to Iberia, in 1808.
 Ode to Robert Brooke, in 1784.
 Ode on the acquittal of Hastings.

Epistles
 Occasional epistles, in 1783.
 Epistle to Hayley.

Miscellaneous
 A voyage up the Red Sea, in 1780.
 Inquiry into the feasibility of the supposed Expedition of Napoleon Bonaparte to the East, in 1796.
 Napoleon Bonaparte in Egypt in 1798.
 The failure of the French Crusade; or the advantages to be derived from the restoration of Egypt to the Turks, in 1799.
 The Bedouins, or, Arabs of the desert: a comic opera, in 1802.
 Napoleon; or the Vanity of Human Wishes, in 1814.

References

External links
 The Annual biography and obituary, Volume 2 – Longman, Hurst, Rees, Orme, and Brown, 1818
 The Poetical register, and repository of fugitive poetry for ..., Volume 8 – F. and C. Rivington, 1814

1751 births
1817 deaths
18th-century Irish writers
19th-century Irish writers
Irish poets
British East India Company civil servants
Members of the Royal Irish Academy